The 2008-09 Biathlon World Cup/Individual Men will start at Wednesday, December 3, 2008, in Östersund and will finish Wednesday, March 11, 2009, in Vancouver at the pre-olympic Biathlon event. Defending titlist is Vincent Defrasne of France.

Competition format
The 20 kilometres (12 mi) individual race is the oldest biathlon event; the distance is skied over five laps. The biathlete shoots four times at any shooting lane, in the order of prone, standing, prone, standing, totalling 20 targets. For each missed target a fixed penalty time, usually one minute, is added to the skiing time of the biathlete. Competitors' starts are staggered, normally by 30 seconds.

2007-08 Top 3 Standings

Medal winners

Final standings

References

Biathlon World Cup - Individual Men, 2008-09